Opsin-3 also known as encephalopsin or panopsin is a protein that, in humans, is encoded by the OPN3 gene. Alternative splicing of this gene results in multiple transcript variants encoding different protein isoforms.

Function 

Opsins are members of the G protein-coupled receptor superfamily. In addition to the visual opsins, mammals possess several photoreceptive non-visual opsins that are expressed in tissues outside the eye. The opsin-3 gene is strongly expressed in brain and testis and weakly expressed in liver, placenta, heart, lung, skeletal muscle, kidney, and pancreas. The gene is expressed in the skin and may also be expressed in the retina. The protein has the canonical features of a photoreceptive opsin protein, however in human skin, OPN3 is not photoreceptive and acts as a negative regulator of melanogenesis.

Applications 
When OPN3 analogues are expressed in neurons, activation by light inhibits neurotransmitter release. This makes these analogues useful tools for optogenetic silencing, a method to study the impact of specific neurons on brain function.

References

Further reading 

 
 
 
 

G protein-coupled receptors